The 2016–17 Pittsburgh Panthers women's basketball team will represent Pittsburgh University during the 2016–17 NCAA Division I women's basketball season. The Panthers, led by fourth year head coach Suzie McConnell-Serio, played their home games at the Petersen Events Center and the Panthers, fourth year members of the Atlantic Coast Conference. They finished the season 13–17, 4–12 in ACC play to finish in a tie for eleventh place. They lost in the first round of the ACC women's tournament to North Carolina.

2016–17 media

Pitt Panthers Sports Network
The Pitt Panthers Sports Network will broadcast all Panthers games on WJAS. George Von Benko will provide the play-by-play while Jen Tuscano will provide the analysis. Non-televised home games can be watched online via Pitt Panthers TV with the Panthers Sports Network call.

Roster

Schedule

|-
!colspan=9 style="background:#091C44; color:#CEC499;" |Exhibition

|-
!colspan=9 style="background:#091C44; color:#CEC499;"| Non-conference regular season

|-
!colspan=9 style="background:#091C44; color:#CEC499;"| ACC regular season

|-
!colspan=9 style="background:#091C44; color:#CEC499;"| ACC Women's Tournament

Rankings

References

Pittsburgh Panthers women's basketball seasons
Pittsburgh
Pittsburgh
Pittsburgh